Stephanie Tum  is a Cameroonian actress, model and philanthropist. She is known in Cinema of Cameroon for her role in the movie Pink Poison released in 2011, and  produced by Agbor Gilbert Ebot. As a humanitarian, her campaign GirlsAndHygiene  which seeks to promote and encourage safe and clean physical  practices among young girls in Cameroon and beyond has given her both national and international recognition. She was nominated for best Social Media Campaign for Mental Health Awareness at the Bonteh Digital Awards, most Influential Young Cameroonian below the age of 40 in the category of entertainment by Avance Media & COSDEF Group in 2017 and 2018 respectively.

Career 
Stephanie, started her acting career in 2009 and quit the screen until her return in 2013 in the movie "Viri" according to an interview with celebrity website Dcodedtv, she explains her reason for the long break:  She recently starred in the Cinema of Cameroon in Shrill and Little Cindy movies in 2018. The same year, she launched EMBI Company Ltd for  movie production and a charity foundation  to sensitize young women on menstrual hygiene, free sanitary pads distribution to young girls and according to a publication by Journal du Cameroun her foundation will distribute 10.000 sanitary pad by the end of 2019 in the Cameroon Anglophone communities. In 2010 to 2015 she was the brand ambassador for Activ Clear.  She was listed amongst the most influential Cameroonians between 15–49 years in the category of entertainment by Avance Media & COSDEF Group 2018 edition and Best Social Media Campaign for Mental Health Awareness by Bonteh Digital Awards.

Personal life 
The Pink Poison actress is a mother of two boys.

Influnce 
Stephanie Tum is a role model for many young women in Cameroon. Through her GirlsAndHygiene campaign, she speaks to young women on the importance of personal physical hygiene, and skincare practices to keep them looking healthy and beautiful.

Filmography
Pink Poison (2011) with Agbor Gilbert Ebot
Viri (As a Cocky lawyer) 2013.
Shrill (As a slay queen) 
Little Cindy (2017)
The Giant Broom
The Planters Plantation (2022)

Awards and recognition

See also 

 List of Cameroonian Actors
 Cinema of Cameroon

References

External links

Living people
Cameroonian film directors
Cameroonian actresses
1987 births
People from Bamenda